John Stauffer (May 28, 1925 – October 26, 2019) was an American businessman and politician from Pennsylvania who served as a Republican member of the Pennsylvania Senate for the 19th district from 1969 to 1988.

Early life
Stauffer was born in Phoenixville, Pennsylvania and graduated from Phoenixville Area High School. He owned the Stauffer's Mens Store in Phoenixville.

Political career
He served on the Phoenixville Borough Council and was president of the borough council.  He served as a member of the Pennsylvania House of Representatives for the Chester County district from 1965 to 1966 and the 157th district from 1967 to 1970.  Stauffer served as a member of the Pennsylvania State Senate for the 19th district from 1970 to 1988 including as Republican Whip from 1977 to 1982 and as Republican Leader from 1985 to 1988.

Death and interment
Stauffer moved to Homestead Village in Lancaster, Pennsylvania in 1994 and died there in 2019.  He is interred at the Green Tree Church of the Brethren Cemetery in Oaks, Pennsylvania.

References

1925 births
2019 deaths
20th-century American politicians
Burials in Pennsylvania
Businesspeople from Pennsylvania
Republican Party members of the Pennsylvania House of Representatives
Republican Party Pennsylvania state senators
People from Phoenixville, Pennsylvania
20th-century American businesspeople

Politicians from Chester County, Pennsylvania